Tourville-sur-Arques (literally Tourville on Arques) is a commune in the Seine-Maritime department in the Normandy region in northern France.

Geography

Population

Places of interest
 The church of St. Martin, dating from the sixteenth century.
 The sixteenth-century château of Miromesnil, with its park and gardens.

People
Guy de Maupassant, French writer, was born at the château in 1850.

See also
Communes of the Seine-Maritime department

References

Communes of Seine-Maritime